A3 problem solving is a structured problem-solving and continuous-improvement approach, first employed at Toyota and typically used by lean manufacturing practitioners. It provides a simple and strict procedure that guides problem solving by workers. The approach typically uses a single sheet of ISO A3-size paper, which is the source of its name.

See also

 Analytical quality control
 Corrective and preventative action (CAPA)
 Eight Disciplines Problem Solving
 First article inspection (FAI)
 Ishikawa diagram
 Plan–do–check–act
 
 Root cause analysis
 Quality assurance
 Quality management framework
 Value stream mapping

Notes

References
 
 
 

Quality control tools